Gongolgon is a rural locality in Brewarrina Shire, in northern New South Wales, Australia,  from Sydney. The median weekly household income was $537. 

Gongolgon is located on the Brewarrina–Coolabah road. Its nearest school is Brewarrina Central School (K-12). 

The Yetta Dhinnakkal Centre, aka Brewarrina jail, is located in Gongolgon.

References

Localities in New South Wales